{{Infobox Wrestling event
|name       = The Great American Bash
|image      = The_Great_American_Bash_95.jpg
|caption    = Promotional poster
|tagline    = Back By Popular Demand!
Celebrate With Some Red, White, Black and Blue!
|promotion  = World Championship Wrestling
|date       = June 18, 1995
|venue      = Hara Arena
|city       = Dayton, Ohio
|attendance = 6,000
|lastevent  = Slamboree
|nextevent  = Bash at the Beach
|event      = The Great American Bash
|nextevent2 = 1996
|lastevent2 = 1992
}}
The 1995 Great American Bash was the fifth Great American Bash professional wrestling pay-per-view event produced by World Championship Wrestling (WCW), and ninth Great American Bash event overall. It took place on June 18, 1995, at the Hara Arena in Dayton, Ohio. This was the first Great American Bash event in nearly three years, with the last event taking place in 1992.

Seven matches were contested at the event. The main event was a standard wrestling match between Ric Flair and Randy Savage, which was part of a rivalry stemming from a match in a tournament to crown the new United States Heavyweight Champion. Flair defeated Savage. The undercard featured many matches including a tournament final for the United States Heavyweight Championship between Sting and Meng. Sting defeated Meng to win the title.

Production
Background
The Great American Bash is a professional wrestling event established in 1985. It was first produced by the National Wrestling Alliance's (NWA) Jim Crockett Promotions (JCP) and aired on closed-circuit television before becoming a pay-per-view event in 1988; JCP was rebranded as World Championship Wrestling (WCW) later that same year. WCW then seceded from the NWA in 1991. The 1995 event was the fifth Great American Bash event promoted by WCW and ninth overall. The event took place on June 18, 1995, at the Hara Arena in Dayton, Ohio. It was the first Great American Bash event held since the 1992 event.

Storylines
The event featured wrestlers from pre-existing scripted feuds and storylines. Wrestlers portrayed villains, heroes, or less distinguishable characters in the scripted events that built tension and culminated in a wrestling match or series of matches.

Flair, Savage, and the United States Championship tournament
The two major stories involved the crowning of a new United States Heavyweight Champion and the rivalry between Ric Flair and Randy Savage, as mentioned above. Vader, who had won the championship at Starrcade in December 1994 from Hacksaw Jim Duggan, was stripped of the championship in March after multiple incidents where he injured other wrestlers. Sixteen men, including Flair and Savage, were entered into a tournament taking place beginning on the April 22, 1995 edition of WCW Saturday Night. Flair and Savage were placed in the same side of the bracket and were to potentially meet in the semifinals if things worked out.

Meanwhile, Savage and Flair had their own separate issues with each other stemming from when Flair attacked Savage during his match with Avalanche at Uncensored in February. Flair, at the time, was inactive after having been forced to retire following a loss to Hulk Hogan at Halloween Havoc the previous October. This led to Flair being reinstated as an active wrestler and a tag team match between Hogan and Savage and Flair and Vader at Slamboree in May. Hogan and Savage won the match, but Savage was jumped by his opponents and Arn Anderson in a postmatch brawl. This resulted in Angelo Poffo, Savage’s father, getting attacked by Flair when he got up from his ringside seat to help.

As far as their performance in the tournament, both Savage and Flair won their opening round matchups with Savage defeating The Butcher on the May 6 edition of Saturday Night and Flair defeating The Patriot on the May 14 edition of WCW Main Event.  On the May 27 edition of Saturday Night, broadcast live from Charlotte, North Carolina, Savage defeated Steve Austin in his quarterfinal matchup. Flair took on Alex Wright in his matchup and won by disqualification after Savage interfered and threw Wright out of the ring so he could go after Flair. 

A singles match between Flair and Savage was set for The Great American Bash, but they would square off on the June 3 Saturday Night'' show to determine which one of them would advance to the finals of the tournament. However, before the match was able to begin, Savage went backstage and attacked Flair in a massive brawl that was eventually broken up by WCW security. The match did not take place and both men were eliminated from the tournament. 

Thus, the other semifinal matchup that had been scheduled to take place on the same show was pushed back to The Great American Bash, where it would now serve as the final and the winner would claim the vacant championship. The matchup would pit Sting against Meng. Sting defeated Anderson and Paul Orndorff in his two tournament matches, while Meng defeated Marcus Alexander Bagwell and Brian Pillman in his.

Event

The Fantastics were substitutes for the Rock 'n Roll Express, who failed to show, due to commitments with the National Wrestling Alliance and Smoky Mountain Wrestling. Scott D'Amore was mistakenly billed as Chris Kanyon in this match. After their match, Harlem Heat and Sister Sherri came out to confront Dick Slater and Bunkhouse Buck; Sherri punched Col. Robert Parker and challenged Slater and Buck to a match later that night. Dave Sullivan won a date with the Diamond Doll by defeating Diamond Dallas Page; had Page won he would've taken possession of Ralph, Sulivan's pet rabbit. Referee Nick Patrick disqualified Sgt. Craig Pittman when he refused to let go of the Code Red while Jim Duggan was holding onto the ropes. Pittman was originally supposed to face Marcus Alexander Bagwell, but Bagwell suffered an injury and Duggan was announced as his replacement. The match between Sting and Meng was originally scheduled as a semifinal match in the United States Championship Tournament started after Vader was stripped of the title. However, the other semifinal between Ric Flair and Randy Savage ended in a no-contest and both men were eliminated from the tournament.

Results

Tournament bracket 

This match was originally scheduled as a semifinal match in the tournament but the other semi-final match between Randy Savage and Ric Flair ended in a no contest and both men were eliminated from the tournament, resulting in Sting and Meng's match determining the champion.

References

External links
The Great American Bash 1995

1995
1995 in Ohio
Events in Ohio
Professional wrestling in Dayton, Ohio
June 1995 events in the United States
1995 World Championship Wrestling pay-per-view events
Events in Dayton, Ohio